The bZIP intron candida is an unconventional bZIP intron located in the HAC1 mRNA in a subgroup of fungi from Saccharomycetales order. So far all species with this type of structure belong to Metschnikowiaceae or Debaryomycetaceae families. However, some of the best known representatives of Debaryomycetaceae - Candida albicans and its closest relatives - contain the shorter RNA structure instead (bZIP intron ascomycota-like). The consensus structure consists of two well conserved hairpins with loop regions defining the unconventional splice sites. The hairpins are separated by a long insertion with conserved motifs and a predicted secondary structure. Splicing performed by Ire1 results in excision of a very long intron that was first described in Candida parapsilosis.

References

RNA splicing
Non-coding RNA